Kalpi is a town in Uttar Pradesh, India. 

Kalpi may also refer to:

 Kalpi (fruit), a natural citrus hybrid native to the Philippines
 Kalpi (Assembly constituency), a constituency of the Uttar Pradesh Legislative Assembly
 Kalpi, Ambala, an area of Ambala, Haryana, India

See also 
 Kalpis, a type of Greek pottery